Johnson County Courthouse is a historic courthouse located at Warrensburg, Johnson County, Missouri. It was built between 1896 and 1898, and is a 2 1/2-story, Romanesque Revival style sandstone building.  It has a cross-gabled building with a square tower rising from a central base.  The building features the central tower's octagonal, ogee-shaped dome, plus four corner towers or pavilions with domes and finials.  It replaced the Johnson County Courthouse on Old Public Square.

It was designed by George E
 McDonald, who designed at least three other courthouses listed on the National Register of Historic Places. This one was listed in 1994.

References

County courthouses in Missouri
Courthouses on the National Register of Historic Places in Missouri
Romanesque Revival architecture in Missouri
Government buildings completed in 1898
Buildings and structures in Johnson County, Missouri
National Register of Historic Places in Johnson County, Missouri